Cap Corse, a geographical area of Corsica, is a  long peninsula located at the northern tip of the island. At the base of it is the second largest city in Corsica, Bastia. Cap Corse is also a Communauté de communes comprising 18 communes. The area of the Communauté de communes is 305.7 km2, and its population was 6,706 in 2019.

The communes
Starting on the west side and working north around the peninsula the communes are:

 Olmeta-di-Capocorso
 Nonza
 Olcani
 Ogliastro
 Canari
 Barrettali

 Pino
 Morsiglia
 Centuri
 Ersa
 Rogliano
 Tomino

 Meria
 Luri
 Cagnano
 Pietracorbara
 Sisco
 Brando

The canton of Cap Corse is slightly larger, and also includes the communes Farinole, Patrimonio, San-Martino-di-Lota and Santa-Maria-di-Lota.

History
Numerous historians have termed Cap Corse "the Sacred Promontory" and have gone so far as to suppose the name came from a high concentration of early Christian settlements. This is a folk etymology.

The term comes from the geographer Ptolemy, who called his first and northernmost location on Corsica the hieron akron in ancient Greek, translated by the Romans as sacrum promontorium. This is not the only point of land to be so called; there were many others in the classical world, none of them Christian. The meaning is somewhat ambiguous, whether it was called that because of a temple placed there or whether as the end of the land it was sacred to the god of the sea. If the date of the Geography is taken arbitrarily to be 100 AD, and Ptolemy was working from earlier sources, a Christian association is highly unlikely. There is no evidence either that Corsica was converted earlier than the 6th century AD, or of any Christian communities in the area in Ptolemy's time, and the concentration of later Christian edifices is no greater than they are in any populated region of Corsica.

Ptolemy's interpretation of promontory also is not clear. It has been taken to mean the entire Cap Corse, the Pointe du Cap Corse, or some one of the small promontories on it. Sometimes it is associated with Macinaggio, but the problem remains unsolved.

There is some geographic justification for associating Ptolemy's entire tribe, the Vanacini, who are described as "more to the north", with Cap Corse, as it is a distinct geophysical environment. The Vanacini appear in a bronze tablet found in northern Corsica repeating a letter from the emperor Vespasian to "the magistrates and senators of the Vanacini" written about 72 AD, in Ptolemy's time. The Vanacini had bought some land from Colonia Mariana, a Roman colony in the vicinity of Bastia, and complained about the borders fixed by the procurator from whom they had bought it. The emperor, on receiving the complaint, appointed another procurator to arbitrate and wrote informing the complainants. The inscription is documentary evidence of the historicity of the Vanacini.

See also
Macinaggio (village)

Notes

External links
 
 

Landforms of Corsica
Corse
Commune communities in France
Intercommunalities of Haute-Corse